The Asian Women's Volleyball Challenge Cup, also known as the AVC Women's Challenge Cup, is an international volleyball competition in Asia and Oceania contested by the bottom senior women's national teams of the members of Asian Volleyball Confederation (AVC), the sport's continent governing body. The tournament will be held every two years, with the first to take place in 2022. The current champion is Hong Kong, which won its first title at the 2022 tournament.

The first two editions of the AVC Women’s Challenge Cup were due to take place in Hong Kong, China, but due to unforeseen reasons, the first edition in 2018 could not be held, while the second edition two years later was also cancelled due to grave concerns over the COVID-19 pandemic.

This event should not be confused with the other, more prestigious, continental competition for Asian national women's volleyball teams, the Asian Volleyball Championship and Asian Volleyball Cup.

Results summary

Teams reaching the top four

Champions by region

Hosts
List of hosts by number of challenge cups hosted.

Medal summary

Participating nations
Legend
 – Champions
 – Runners-up
 – Third place
 – Fourth place
 – Did not enter / Did not qualify
 – Hosts
Q – Qualified for forthcoming tournament

Debut of teams

Awards

See also
 Asian Men's Volleyball Challenge Cup
 Asian Women's Volleyball Cup
 Asian Women's Volleyball Championship
 Volleyball at the Asian Games
 Asian Women's U23 Volleyball Championship
 Asian Women's U19 Volleyball Championship
 Asian Girls' U17 Volleyball Championship

References

External links
 Asian Volleyball Confederation – official website

 
Asian Volleyball Challenge Cup
V
International volleyball competitions
International women's volleyball competitions
Volleyball competitions in Asia
Biennial sporting events
2018 establishments in Asia
Asian Volleyball Confederation competitions